The 1917 Camp Upton football team represented the United States Army's 77th Division that trained at Camp Upton in Yaphank on Long Island, New York, during the 1917 college football season. Former Princeton halfback Frank Glick was the team's coach.

By October 1917, 30,000 recruits were stationed at Camp Upton, and athletic competition was part of the camp's training regimen. Regimental football teams competed against one another before an all-cantonment team was formed in November 1917.

Former Harvard All-American Robert Treat Paine Storer played for the Camp Upton all-cantonment team.

On November 24, the team lost a close game to Camp Devens (coached by Harvard's Percy Haughton) at the Polo Grounds in New York City.

The 77th Division was deployed to France in 1918.  The Lost Battalion, part of the 77th, sustained heavy losses in the Argonne Forest in October 1918.

Schedule

References

Camp Upton
College football winless seasons
Camp Upton football